Karp may refer to:

Places
 Karp, Podlaskie Voivodeship, in north-east Poland
 Karp, Lublin Voivodeship, in east Poland

People
 Karp (surname)
 Karp Khachvankyan (1923–1998), Armenian actor and director

Other uses
 KARP-FM, a radio station in Dassel, Minnesota, United States
 Karp (band), an American 1990s rock band
 Karp class submarine, ordered in 1904 by the Russian Empire, also the namesake submarine in the class
 Korean Association of Retired Persons, a non-governmental organization affiliated with the United Nations

See also
 Magikarp (Pokémon)
 Carp (disambiguation)